Dhanna Singh Gulshan was an Indian politician. He was a Member of Parliament, representing Bathinda, Punjab in the Lok Sabha the lower house of India's Parliament as a member of the Akali Dal.

References

External links
Official biographical sketch in Parliament of India website

1910 births
Year of death missing
Lok Sabha members from Punjab, India
Shiromani Akali Dal politicians
India MPs 1962–1967
India MPs 1977–1979